Joseph Pessach (November 17, 1905, Sir Lowry's Pass Village – April 27, 1978, Los Angeles), better known by his stage name Josef Marais, was a folk-singer from South Africa.

Biography

Marais left South Africa in the 1920s to study violin and viola in Europe, finally settling in London. He toured as a concert violinist for several years and when he heard that His Master's Voice was eager to record songs in Afrikaans for the South African market, he offered his services. The very successful recordings were heard by the BBC who approached Marais with the request that he translate and perform the songs for British audiences. These broadcasts were heard by the British representative of NBC and Marais was invited to New York in 1939 to do a radio show for NBC. In 1945, he started singing with Rosa de Miranda, a Dutch immigrant with whom he had worked for a few years. They performed for more than 30 years as Marais and Miranda, recording many South African traditional folk ballads and original songs such as "Zulu Warrior".

Several of their songs achieved popularity when recorded by high-profile American recording artists, such as "Sugar Bush" (a duet between Doris Day and Frankie Laine), "A-round the Corner (Beneath the Berry Tree)" (Jo Stafford) and "Ma Says, Pa Says" (a duet between Doris Day and Johnnie Ray).

Partial discography

Marais & Miranda
Josef Marais and his Bushveld Band - Songs of the South African Veld (Decca DLP 5014 10")
Josef Marais and his Bushveld Band - Songs from the Veld (Decca DLP 5083 10")
Josef Marais and Miranda - Songs Of Many Lands (Decca DL 5106 10")
Marais and Miranda - In Person Vol.1 (Decca DL 9026)
Marais and Miranda - In Person Vol.2 (Decca DL 9027)
Marais and Miranda - Christmas with Marais and Miranda (Decca DL 9030)
Marais and Miranda - Africana Suite and Songs of Spirit and Humor (Decca DL 9047)
Josef Marais and Miranda - Revisit the South African Veld (Decca DL 8811)
Josef Marais and Miranda - South African Folk Songs (Harmony HL 7043)
Marais and Miranda - No Dolly No and Other Rare Folk Songs (MGM E4143)
Marais and Miranda - Nature Songs (Motivation Records MR 0318)
Marais and Miranda - More Nature Songs (Motivation Records MR 0320)
Marais and Miranda - Souvenir Album (Glendale GLS6022)

References

External links
 
 Marais and Miranda website (via the Internet Archive)
 Ballads for the Age of Science (include Nature Songs and More Nature Songs)

1905 births
1978 deaths
Afrikaner people
Afrikaans-language singers
20th-century South African male singers
South African folk singers
South African expatriates in the United Kingdom